This is a list of college football coaches with 150 career wins in NCAA Division I FCS, the lower of two levels of NCAA Division I football.

Historical overview
FCS, short for "Football Championship Subdivision", was created in 1978 when the NCAA split Division I football into two groups. The strongest programs and conferences were placed in Division I-A, known since 2006 as the Football Bowl Subdivision (FBS). Other Division I football programs were placed in Division I-AA, which was renamed as FCS in 2006.

The official NCAA record book contains a list of the 50 winningest FCS coaches. However, it is not truly indicative of the most successful coaches at that level because of the criteria used for its compilation. Inclusion on the list requires a minimum of 10 years as a head coach at the FCS level, but each coach's win total includes all wins at four-year institutions, regardless of whether these schools were FCS at that time.

As of the 2021 NCAA Division I Football Championship Game on May 15 of that year, a total of 13 head football coaches have won 150 or more games while serving in that role at the FCS level.

Key

Coaches with 150 career FCS wins

Updated as of the end of the 2020–21 season.

See also
 List of college football coaches with 200 wins (for coaches with 200 wins at four-year schools regardless of level)
 List of college football coaches with 100 losses
 List of college football coaches with 20 ties
 List of college football coaches with 0 career wins
 List of college football coaches with 30 seasons
 List of college football coaches with a .750 winning percentage
 List of National Football League head coaches

Notes

References

150 career FCS wins